Francesco "Frank" Rugolo (born 5 September 1963) is a former Australian rules footballer who played with Melbourne in the Victorian Football League (VFL).

He later played in the Victorian Football Association for Sandringham. He was the leading goalkicker of the 1991 home-and-away season with 78 goals, before finishing second overall after the finals.

Rugolo's brother Joe also played for Melbourne during the 1980s.

Notes

External links 
		
DemonWiki page

1963 births
Australian rules footballers from Victoria (Australia)
Melbourne Football Club players
Sandringham Football Club players
Living people